The Star-Spangled Banner National Historic Trail is a National Historic Trail that commemorates the Chesapeake Campaign of the War of 1812.  The  trail was named after "The Star-Spangled Banner," the national anthem of the United States.  Consisting of water and overland routes, the trail extends from Tangier Island, Virginia, through southern Maryland, the District of Columbia, the Chesapeake Bay, and Baltimore, Maryland. The trail also contains sites on Maryland's Eastern shore.

Activities on the trail include hiking, biking, boating, and geocaching on the Star-Spangled Banner Geotrail. Sites on the trail include towns raided and/or burned by the British, battles and engagements, museums, and forts.

It was authorized by the Consolidated Natural Resources Act of 2008.

References

External links
 Star-Spangled Banner National Historic Trail
 Star-Spangled Banner National Historic Trail Feasibility Study
 National Park Service Star-Spangled Banner National Historic Trail Guide

2008 establishments in Maryland
Chesapeake Bay
Protected areas of Maryland
Protected areas of Washington, D.C.
Protected areas of Virginia
Landmarks of the War of 1812
National Historic Trails of the United States
2008 establishments in Washington, D.C.
2008 establishments in Virginia
Protected areas established in 2008